The 1969 Northern Arizona Lumberjacks football team was an American football team that represented Northern Arizona University (NAU) as an independent during the 1969 NCAA College Division football season. In their first year under head coach John Symank, the Lumberjacks compiled a 7–3 record and outscored opponents by a total of 284 to 182.

The team played its home games at Lumberjack Stadium in Flagstaff, Arizona.

Schedule

References

Northern Arizona
Northern Arizona Lumberjacks football seasons
Northern Arizona Lumberjacks football